The 2016 Mazda Prototype Lites season was the eleventh season of the IMSA Lites championship. The championship featured two classes, L1 and L2. During the season there were few L2 entrants, therefore no championship points were awarded.

Calendar and results

Final standings

{|
|

References

2016
Mazda Prototype Lites